Jimmy Fowlie is an American actor, writer and comedian who publishes YouTube content. Formerly of The Groundlings, he produced Go-Go Boy Interrupted, an LGBT-themed comedy web series based on his live sketch comedy show of the same name. He is also known for writing and performing as Emma Stone in the one-woman Off-Broadway show So Long Boulder City.

Career
Fowlie appeared on Jimmy Kimmel Live!, The Joe Schmo Show, and online shorts by CollegeHumor and Nacho Punch. He appeared on HBO's The Comeback in 2014, and is a participant in the CBS Diversity Showcase.

Fowlie began performing with The Groundlings around 2012, later teaching improv with the troupe. Starting in June 2014 he began performing Go-Go Boy Interrupted, an LGBT-themed sketch comedy show, at The Groundlings theater. A few months later he adapted the show into a web series first shown on YouTube in October 2014. It chronicles the adventures of Danny Carter, a 30-year-old "washed up" male go-go dancer, based on Fowlie's own experiences as a go-go dancer in West Hollywood while attending the University of Southern California. The live version of Go-Go Boy Interrupted continued in 2015.

Fowlie also co-wrote and performed the one-woman Off-Broadway show So Long Boulder City, based on the fictional show created by Emma Stone's character Mia Dolan in the 2016 film La La Land. Co-written and directed by Jordan Black, So Long Boulder City was performed in Los Angeles before its six-month run at the SubCulture Off-Broadway theater in New York City.

He is a contributor to The Huffington Post.

Fowlie was hired as a writer for Saturday Night Live in 2022, at the beginning of the show's 48th season.

Personal life
Fowlie is a native of Bedford, Massachusetts, outside of Boston, where he graduated from Walnut Hill School. He majored in theatre at the University of Southern California in Los Angeles. Fowlie is gay.

Filmography

Film and television

Theatre

References

External links
 
 
 
 Official Go-Go Boy Interrupted website
 
 
 

American bloggers
Entertainers from California
American gay writers
American gay actors
LGBT people from California
Living people
Male actors from Boston
USC School of Dramatic Arts alumni
Video bloggers
Writers from California
American YouTubers
LGBT YouTubers
American male bloggers
Year of birth missing (living people)
21st-century LGBT people